The Rössler attractor  is the attractor for the Rössler system, a system of three non-linear ordinary differential equations originally studied by Otto Rössler in the 1970s. These differential equations define a continuous-time dynamical system that exhibits chaotic dynamics associated with the fractal properties of the attractor.

Some properties of the Rössler system can be deduced via linear methods such as eigenvectors, but the main features of the system require non-linear methods such as Poincaré maps and bifurcation diagrams. The original Rössler paper states the Rössler attractor was intended to behave similarly to the Lorenz attractor, but also be easier to analyze qualitatively. An orbit within the attractor follows an outward spiral close to the  plane around an unstable fixed point. Once the graph spirals out enough, a second fixed point influences the graph, causing a rise and twist in the -dimension. In the time domain, it becomes apparent that although each variable is oscillating within a fixed range of values, the oscillations are chaotic. This attractor has some similarities to the Lorenz attractor, but is simpler and has only one manifold. Otto Rössler designed the Rössler attractor in 1976, but the originally theoretical equations were later found to be useful in modeling equilibrium in chemical reactions.

Definition
The defining equations of the Rössler system are:

Another line of the parameter space was investigated using the topological analysis. How Rössler discovered this set of equations was investigated by Letellier and Messager.

An analysis 

Some of the Rössler attractor's elegance is due to two of its equations being linear; setting , allows examination of the behavior on the  plane

From this, we can see that when , the eigenvalues are complex and both have a positive real component, making the origin unstable with an outwards spiral on the  plane.

Fixed points 
In order to find the fixed points, the three Rössler equations are set to zero and the  coordinates of each fixed point were determined by solving the resulting equations.  This yields the general equations of each of the fixed point coordinates:

Which in turn can be used to show the actual fixed points for a given set of parameter values:
 
 

As shown in the general plots of the Rössler Attractor above, one of these fixed points resides in the center of the attractor loop and the other lies relatively far from the attractor.

Eigenvalues and eigenvectors 
The stability of each of these fixed points can be analyzed by determining their respective eigenvalues and eigenvectors.  Beginning with the Jacobian:
 

the eigenvalues can be determined by solving the following cubic:

For the centrally located fixed point, Rössler's original parameter values of a=0.2, b=0.2, and c=5.7 yield eigenvalues of:
 
 
 

The magnitude of a negative eigenvalue characterizes the level of attraction along the corresponding eigenvector.  Similarly the magnitude of a positive eigenvalue characterizes the level of repulsion along the corresponding eigenvector.

The eigenvectors corresponding to these eigenvalues are:
 
 
 

These eigenvectors have several interesting implications.  First, the two eigenvalue/eigenvector pairs ( and ) are responsible for the steady outward slide that occurs in the main disk of the attractor.  The last eigenvalue/eigenvector pair is attracting along an axis that runs through the center of the manifold and accounts for the z motion that occurs within the attractor.  This effect is roughly demonstrated with the figure below.

The figure examines the central fixed point eigenvectors. The green line is an illustration of the attracting . The magenta line is generated by stepping backwards through time from a point on the attracting eigenvector which is slightly above  – it illustrates the behavior of points that become completely dominated by that vector. Note that the magenta line nearly touches the plane of the attractor before being pulled upwards into the fixed point; this suggests that the general appearance and behavior of the Rössler attractor is largely a product of the interaction between the attracting  and the repelling  and  plane.

 
 
 

The eigenvectors corresponding to these eigenvalues are:
 
 
 

Although these eigenvalues and eigenvectors exist in the Rössler attractor, their influence is confined to iterations of the Rössler system whose initial conditions are in the general vicinity of this outlier fixed point. As the resulting sequence approaches the central fixed point and the attractor itself, the influence of this distant fixed point (and its eigenvectors) will wane.

Poincaré map 

The Poincaré map is constructed by plotting the value of the function every time it passes through a set plane in a specific direction. An example would be plotting the  value every time it passes through the  plane where  is changing from negative to positive, commonly done when studying the Lorenz attractor. In the case of the Rössler attractor, the  plane is uninteresting, as the map always crosses the  plane at  due to the nature of the Rössler equations. The number of points in this specific Poincaré plot is infinite, but when a different  value is used, the number of points can vary. For example, with a  value of 4, there is only one point on the Poincaré map, because the function yields a periodic orbit of period one, or if the  value is set to 12.8, there would be six points corresponding to a period six orbit.

Mapping local maxima 

In the original paper on the Lorenz Attractor, Edward Lorenz analyzed the local maxima of  against the immediately preceding local maxima. When visualized, the plot resembled the tent map, implying that similar analysis can be used between the map and attractor. Knowing that the Rössler attractor can be used to create a pseudo 1-d map, it then follows to use similar analysis methods. The bifurcation diagram is a particularly useful analysis method.

Variation of parameters
In general, varying each parameter has a comparable effect by causing the system to converge toward a periodic orbit, fixed point, or escape towards infinity, however the specific ranges and behaviors induced vary substantially for each parameter. Periodic orbits, or "unit cycles," of the Rössler system are defined by the number of loops around the central point that occur before the loops series begins to repeat itself.

Bifurcation diagrams are a common tool for analyzing the behavior of dynamical systems, of which the Rössler attractor is one. They are created by running the equations of the system, holding all but one of the variables constant and varying the last one. Then, a graph is plotted of the points that a particular value for the changed variable visits after transient factors have been neutralised. Chaotic regions are indicated by filled-in regions of the plot.

Varying a
Here,  is fixed at 0.2,  is fixed at 5.7 and  changes. Numerical examination of the attractor's behavior over changing  suggests it has a disproportional influence over the attractor's behavior. The results of the analysis are:
 : Converges to the centrally located fixed point
 : Unit cycle of period 1
 : Standard parameter value selected by Rössler, chaotic
 : Chaotic attractor, significantly more Möbius strip-like (folding over itself).
 : Similar to .3, but increasingly chaotic
 : Similar to .35, but increasingly chaotic.

Varying b

Here,  is fixed at 0.2,  is fixed at 5.7 and  changes. Comparative to the other parameters, varying   generates a greater range when period-3 and period-6 orbits will occur.

Varying c

Here,  and  changes. This pattern repeats itself as  increases – there are sections of periodicity interspersed with periods of chaos, and the trend is towards higher-period orbits as  increases. For example, the period one orbit only appears for values of  around 4 and is never found again in the bifurcation diagram. The same phenomenon is seen with period three; until , period three orbits can be found, but thereafter, they do not appear.

A graphical illustration of the changing attractor over a range of  values illustrates the general behavior seen for all of these parameter analyses – the frequent transitions between periodicity and aperiodicity.

, period-1 orbit.
, period-2 orbit.
, period-4 orbit.
, period-8 orbit.
, sparse chaotic attractor.
, period-3 orbit.
, period-6 orbit.
 , sparse chaotic attractor.
, filled-in chaotic attractor.

Periodic orbits 
The attractor is filled densely with periodic orbits: solutions for which there exists a nonzero value of  such that . These interesting solutions can be numerically derived using Newton's method. As the majority of the dynamics occurs in the x-y plane, the periodic orbits can then be classified by their winding number around the central equilibrium after projection.

It seems from numerical experimentation that there is a unique periodic orbit for all positive winding numbers. This lack of degeneracy likely stems from the problem's lack of symmetry. The attractor can be dissected into easier to digest invariant manifolds: 1D periodic orbits and the 2D stable and unstable manifolds of periodic orbits. These invariant manifolds are a natural skeleton of the attractor, just as rational numbers are to the real numbers.

For the purposes of dynamical systems theory, one might be interested in topological invariants of these manifolds. The periodic orbits with winding numbers 1 and 2 form a Hopf link, showing that no diffeomorphism can separate these orbits.

Links to other topics 
The banding evident in the Rössler attractor is similar to a Cantor set rotated about its midpoint. Additionally, the half-twist that occurs in the Rössler attractor only affects a part of the attractor. Rössler showed that his attractor was in fact the combination of a "normal band" and a Möbius strip.

References

External links
 Flash Animation using PovRay
 Rossler1976.pdf
 Lorenz and Rössler attractors – Java animation
 3D Attractors: Mac program to visualize and explore the Rössler and Lorenz attractors in 3 dimensions
 Rössler attractor in Scholarpedia
 Rössler Attractor : Numerical interactive experiment in 3D - experiences.math.cnrs.fr- (javascript/webgl)

Chaotic maps